Jon Willis ("Jack") Fultz (born August 27, 1948) is a retired American long-distance runner, who came to prominence in the 1970s after winning the 1976 Boston Marathon, the world's oldest and most established marathon race.

Early years
Fultz was born  in Franklin, Pennsylvania, the sixth of seven children.  He grew up in Franklin, where he attended Franklin Area High School , where he graduated in 1966.

Running career

Collegiate
Fultz first attended the University of Arizona in Tucson from 1967 to 1969. In 1969, he enlisted in the United States Coast Guard, serving from 1969 to 1973. Following his tour of duty, Fultz enrolled in graduate classes at Georgetown University until his graduation in 1976. While at Georgetown Fultz competed for the men's track team in various middle-distance events, including the mile run and the 3000 meter steeplechase. He ran a personal best outdoor mile of 4:08.3 while at Georgetown.

The 1976 Boston Marathon: "The Run for the Hoses"
Fultz won the 1976 Boston Marathon in extreme heat with a time of 2:20:19. The temperature was 100 degrees one hour before the noon start time in Hopkinton, Massachusetts. Over the  course, runners were cooled by water sprayed by spectators using garden hoses.

Achievements
All results regarding marathon, unless stated otherwise

1971 Boston Marathon (2:27:12), 12th Place
1972 Boston Marathon (2:35:11), 56th Place
1976 Boston Marathon (2:20:19), FIRST PLACE
1977 Boston Marathon (2:20:40), 9th Place
1978 Boston Marathon (2:11:17), 4th Place PERSONAL RECORD/BEST TIME (2 seconds behind 3rd place)
1981 Newport Marathon (2:17:09), 1st Place and COURSE RECORD

Awards, distinctions, and items of interest
Fultz qualified for three consecutive United States Olympic Trials marathons in 1972, 1976, and 1980. Because President Jimmy Carter called for a boycott of the 1980 Moscow Games, Fultz did not run in the 1980 Olympic Trials. In 1996, Fultz was inducted into the Georgetown University Hall of Fame and on that occasion was invited to the White House to run with then-President Bill Clinton. Also in 1996, Fultz was inducted into the DC Road Runners Hall of Fame.

Fultz not only finished the Boston Marathon in first place in 1976; in 1995 he added the distinction of finishing in last place as well: Each year, BAA race director Dave McGillivray runs the Boston Marathon course after all the other entrants have started, and nearly all have finished.  In 1995 Fultz accompanied him on the run, and, as the two companions crossed the finish line, Fultz slowed down a step, thus making him the actual last official finisher of the day.

Fultz was diagnosed with arthritis of the hip in 2000, at which time he retired from competitive running.

Current activities
As of November 2008, Fultz is an instructor of sport psychology at Tufts University, a fitness consultant and personal coach, and a training consultant to the Dana-Farber Marathon Challenge. He also is an occasional motivational speaker.

See also
 List of winners of the Boston Marathon

References

External links
 Marathon Men Make Our Hearts Race
2007 Interview with Jack Fultz
Biography of Jack Fultz
Finishline by Dave McGillivray

1948 births
Living people
American male long-distance runners
American male marathon runners
American male steeplechase runners
Georgetown Hoyas men's track and field athletes
People from Franklin, Pennsylvania
Sportspeople from Pennsylvania
Boston Marathon male winners